Chilostoma crombezi is a species of medium-sized, air-breathing, land snail, a terrestrial pulmonate gastropod mollusk in the family Helicidae, the true snails. The species is endemic in France, and is currently Critically endangered.

References

Chilostoma
Gastropods described in 1882